
Gmina Tuszów Narodowy is a rural gmina (administrative district) in Mielec County, Subcarpathian Voivodeship, in south-eastern Poland.

Villages
Gmina Tuszów Narodowy contains the villages and settlements of Babicha, Borki Nizińskie, Chyki-Dębiaki, Czajkowa, Grochowe, Jaślany, Józefów, Ławnica, Malinie, Pluty, Sarnów, Tuszów Mały and Tuszów Narodowy.

Neighbouring gminas
Gmina Tuszów Narodowy is bordered by the town of Mielec and by the gminas of Baranów Sandomierski, Cmolas, Gawłuszowice, Mielec and Padew Narodowa.

References
Polish official population figures 2006

Tuszow Narodowy
Mielec County